The Valkhof Museum is an archaeology and art museum in Nijmegen, Netherlands.

The museum has existed since 1999, created as a merger between the G. M. Kam museum of archaeology and the Commanderie van St. Jan museum of classical and modern art. The museum's collection includes a large and important collection of local Roman archaeological finds and art (mostly modern).

The museum stands on the edge of the Valkhof park, site of a Roman army camp and a citadel built by Charlemagne. The museum's building was designed by Dutch architect Ben van Berkel and was opened on 14 September 1999 by Queen Beatrix.

In November 2008, the official name of the museum was changed to Valkhof-Kam. This reflected an agreement reached with the heirs of G. M. Kam.

See also
 Bergakker inscription
 Nijmegen Helmet

References

External links

 

1999 establishments in the Netherlands
Archaeological museums in the Netherlands
Art museums and galleries in the Netherlands
Museums established in 1999
Museums in Nijmegen
History of Nijmegen
20th-century architecture in the Netherlands